Małgorzata Bogumiła Jarosińska-Jedynak (born October 31, 1979, Rzeszów) is a Polish engineer and statesperson, Deputy  in the Ministry of Investment and Economic Development (2018-2019),  in the Second Cabinet of Mateusz Morawiecki during 2019-2020) and, after the reorganization,  the Secretary of State in this ministry since 2020.

Career
She graduated in environmental engineering from the Faculty of Civil and Environmental Engineering of the Rzeszów University of Technology, as well as post-graduate studies in occupational safety and health at the same university.

She worked in local government administration, dealing with regional development and support for entrepreneurship, first at Tyczyn Commune, and then for 10 years at the Podkarpackie Province, rising to become director of the Department of Entrepreneurship Support. 

On November 29, 2018, Prime Minister Mateusz Morawiecki appointed her Undersecretary of State in the Ministry of Investment and Development, responsible for the implementation of EU funds for innovation, digitization and human capital, as well as supervision of the "Accessibility Plus" program. 

On November 15, 2019, she was appointed the Minister of Funds and Regional Policy in the second government of Mateusz Morawiecki. In October 2020, she was appointed Secretary of State in the Ministry of Funds and Regional Policy.

References

1979 births
Living people
Women government ministers of Poland
Government ministers of Poland
People from Rzeszów